Abū Abd-Allah Najm al-Dīn Aḥmad bin Ḥamdān bin Shabīb bin Ḥamdān al-Ḥarrānī al-Ḥanbalī (Arabic: أبو عبد الله نجم الدِّين أحمد بن حمدان بن شبيب بن حمدان الحراني الحنبلي) commonly known as Ibn Hamdan—was a Hanbalite Muslim scholar and judge (1206–1295). Ibn Hamdan was born and raised in Harran and later in his life went on trips to Damascus, Aleppo and Jerusalem, later settling in Cairo. Ibn Hamdan was appointed judge in Cairo and he lived there until his death in 1295.

Ibn Hamdan was highly skilled in jurisprudence and is considered one of the Imams of the Hanbalite school of jurisprudence. He was also highly knowledgeable in the fields of the Quran, Sunnah, algebra and literature. Ibn Hamdan was also a Mufti and a teacher.

Teachers  
Abd-al-Qadir al-Rahawi, Fakhr al-Din ibn Taymiyah, Yousuf al-Sakakini al-Harrani, Abu-Bakr bin Nasir al-Harrani, Sulama bin Sadaqa, Nasih al-Din bin Jumay', Abu-Ali al-Iwqi, Ibn-Sabbah, Ibn-Ghassa, Ibn-Ruzbah, Ibn-Siddiq al-Harrani, Nasih al-Din bin Abi-al-Fahm, Shams al-Din al-Munja, Ibn-Salama al-Najjar, Ibn Khalil, Majd al-Din ibn Taymiyah.

Students 
Ibn Abi-Bakr al-Harbi, Sayf al-Din al-Nablusi, Sharaf al-Din al-Dimyati, Sa'd al-Din al-Harthi, Ibn al-Haddad al-Amidi, Zain al-Din bin Habib, Ibn Jubara al-Maqdisi, Ibn Mas'ud al-Harthi, Fath al-Din bin Sayid al-Nas, Qutb al-Din Abd-al-Karim, 'alam al-Din al-Birzali, Jamal al-Din al-Mizzi, Badr al-Din bin al-Habbal, Sanqar al-Hawashi, Ibn abi-al-Qasim al-Farqi, Ibn abi-al-Haram al-Qalansi.

Publications 
 Nihayat al-Mubtadi'in fi Usul al-Deen
 Al-Ri'aya al-Kubra
 Al-Ri'aya al-Sughra
 Sifat al-Mufti wa-al-Mustafti
 Muqaddima fi Usul al-Din
 Jami' al-Funun wa-Salwat al-Mahzun

Notes
 Uncle of Taqi ad-Din Ibn Taymiyyah (brother of Shihabuddin Ibn Taymiyyah).
 Father of Fakr al-din Ibn Taymiyyah, grandfather of Taqi ad-Din.

References

Hanbalis
13th-century Muslim scholars of Islam
Sunni Muslim scholars of Islam
People from Harran
1206 births
1295 deaths